Lanosterol 14α-demethylase (CYP51A1) is the animal version of a cytochrome P450 enzyme that is involved in the conversion of lanosterol to 4,4-dimethylcholesta-8(9),14,24-trien-3β-ol. The cytochrome P450 isoenzymes are a conserved group of proteins that serve as key players in the metabolism of organic substances and the biosynthesis of important steroids, lipids, and vitamins in eukaryotes. As a member of this family, lanosterol 14α-demethylase is responsible for an essential step in the biosynthesis of sterols. In particular, this protein catalyzes the removal of the C-14α-methyl group from lanosterol. This demethylation step is regarded as the initial checkpoint in the transformation of lanosterol to other sterols that are widely used within the cell.

Evolution

The structural and functional properties of the cytochrome P450 superfamily have been subject to extensive diversification over the course of evolution. Recent estimates indicate that there are currently 10 classes and 267 families of CYP proteins. It is believed that 14α-demethylase or CYP51 diverged early in the cytochrome's evolutionary history and has preserved its function ever since; namely, the removal of the 14α-methyl group from sterol substrates.

Although CYP51's mode of action has been well conserved, the protein's sequence varies considerably between biological kingdoms. CYP51 sequence comparisons between kingdoms reveal only a 22-30% similarity in amino acid composition.

Structure 

Although the structure of 14α-demethylase may vary substantially from one organism to the next, sequence alignment analysis reveals that there are six regions in the protein that are highly conserved in eukaryotes. These include residues in the B' helix, B'/C loop, C helix, I helix, K/β1-4 loop, and β-strand 1-4 that are responsible for forming the surface of the substrate binding cavity. Homology modeling reveals that substrates migrate from the surface of the protein to the enzyme's buried active site through a channel that is formed in part by the A' alpha helix and the β4 loop. Finally, the active site contains a heme prosthetic group in which the iron is tethered to the sulfur atom on a conserved cysteine residue. This group also binds diatomic oxygen at the sixth coordination site, which is eventually incorporated onto the substrate.

Mechanism 

The enzyme-catalyzed demethylation of lanosterol is believed to occur in three steps, each of which requires one molecule of diatomic oxygen and one molecule of NADPH (or some other reducing equivalent). During the first two steps, the 14α-methyl group undergoes typical cytochrome monooxygenation in which one oxygen atom is incorporated by the substrate and the other is reduced to water, resulting in the sterol's conversion to a carboxyalcohol and then a carboxyaldehyde. The aldehyde then departs as formic acid and a double bond is simultaneously introduced to yield the demethylated product.

See also 
 Steroidogenic enzyme
 Azole antifungals

References

Further reading

External links
 

EC 1.14.14
51
NADPH-dependent enzymes
Enzymes of known structure